Benjamin Louis Trace (né Feinberg; 15 October 1897 – 7 July 1973) was an American songwriter who, from the 1910s through the 1950s, in collaboration with his younger bandleader brother, Al, wrote lyrics to hundreds of popular songs.

Career 
A native of Chicago, Ben Trace wrote the songs which were primarily performed by Al Trace and His Orchestra, including their most successful recording, "You Call Everybody Darlin'", which became a #1 hit in 1948.

1890s births
1976 deaths
American male composers
Songwriters from Illinois
Musicians from Chicago
Place of death missing
20th-century American composers
20th-century American male musicians
American male songwriters